Marjorie Lillian Dence MBE (14 June 1901 – 23 August 1966) was a British  actress and theatre manager based in Perth in Scotland.

Life

Dence was born in Teddington in 1901. Her parents were Annie Eleanor Searle and Ernest Martin Dence (d. 1937) who was a brass-founder and company director.

She went to University in London where she joined the local dramatic society where she knew David Steuart.. In 1934 they were both members of the Lena Ashwell Players.

Her management career began when her father decided to buy the theatre in Perth after Marjorie saw it advertised for £4,000 in The Stage. Her parents appointed her as manager and she and David Steuart. found another £1,000 to refit the theatre. David was an actor and close fiend but they were (only) business partners. Dence appointed the new theatre's company and in 1935 they staged their first play The Rose without a Thorn by Clifford Bax followed by others each week. Dence and Steuart created the "Perth Repertory Company" which was the first professional theatre company in Scotland, led by a woman. In 1937 her father died and she became the owner of the theatre. Finances were slim and the theatre closed for three months in 1937 and 1938 but the following year they created Scotland'd first Theatre Festival just before the second world war started.

During the war the theatre was organised and staffed by the company. The actors lived in the theatre and they undertook all the jobs necessary to keep the theatre running. The theatre made a profit and those profits were shared equally with the company.

She was a Justice of the Peace and in 1952 she was made an MBE.

She died in 1966 in Perth. Under the terms of her will the theatre was offered to the city of Perth for the fixed price of £5,000. This was equal to the original investment in the 1930s. There is a plaque in Perth recording Dence's contribution to the city.

References

1901 births
1966 deaths
People from Teddington
Theatre managers and producers
People from Perth, Scotland
Theatre owners